Reformists of Vojvodina is a social-democratic and regionalist political party in Serbia, mostly active in the autonomous province of Vojvodina.

History
It was founded in October 13, 1990 as the Union of Reform Forces of Yugoslavia for Vojvodina (Savez reformskih snaga Jugoslavije za Vojvodinu) within the unified Yugoslav political movement from that time, whose founder was federal Yugoslav prime minister, Ante Marković.

Since 1992, party was known as the Reformist Democratic Party of Vojvodina (Reformska demokratska stranka Vojvodine), and since 2000 as the Reformists of Vojvodina (Reformisti Vojvodine).

Political goals

Party has social-democratic orientation and claims that state should be decentralized, with autonomous provinces and regions that would have different levels of autonomy, as well as with the local administration.

Party also claims that Vojvodina should have full autonomy, with legislative, judiciary, and executive jurisdictions in all areas, except in those which would be reserved for the state (defense, monetary policy, foreign policy, customs, and state security).

Party cooperates with other regionalist and social-democratic parties.

Participation in elections
At the legislative elections in Vojvodina, on September 19, 2004, the party won 2 seats in the provincial parliament.

Party leadership
Dragoslav Petrović (1990-1996)
Ratko Filipović (1996-1998)
Miodrag Isakov (1998-2007)
Nedeljko Šljivanac, current leader.

References

Further reading
Enciklopedija Novog Sada, knjiga 23, Novi Sad, 2004, pages 267-268.

External links
Official site

Social democratic parties in Serbia
Politics of Vojvodina